Chestnut Ridge is a village in the town of Ramapo, Rockland County, New York, United States, located north of the state of New Jersey, east of Airmont, south of Spring Valley, and west of Nanuet. The population was 7,916 at the 2010 census.

Chestnut Ridge was incorporated in 1986. Prior to 1986, Chestnut Ridge was an unincorporated area within the town of Ramapo often referred to as "South Spring Valley" (its fire district), as many postal addresses carried the Spring Valley designation.

Geography

Demographics

As of the census of 2000, there were 7,829 people, 2,551 households, and 2,107 families residing in the village. The population density was 1,584.6 people per square mile (611.9/km2). There were 2,601 housing units at an average density of 526.4 per square mile (203.3/km2). The racial makeup of the village was 73.96% white, 13.87% African American, 0.13% Native American, 6.74% Asian, 0.06% Pacific Islander, 2.68% from other races, and 2.55% from two or more races. Hispanic or Latino of any race were 8.09% of the population. The village has seen an influx of Haredi Jews in recent years.

There were 2,551 households, out of which 32.3% had children under the age of 18 living with them, 72.2% were married couples living together, 7.3% had a female householder with no husband present, and 17.4% were non-families. 13.6% of all households were made up of individuals, and 6.6% had someone living alone who was 65 years of age or older. The average household size was 2.87 and the average family size was 3.12.

In the village, the population was spread out, with 22.7% under the age of 18, 5.8% from 18 to 24, 27.0% from 25 to 44, 29.1% from 45 to 64, and 15.4% who were 65 years of age or older. The median age was 42 years. For every 100 females, there were 94.8 males. For every 100 females age 18 and over, there were 89.2 males.

The median income for a household in the village was $86,468, and the median income for a family was $95,551. Males had a median income of $57,420 versus $43,548 for females. The per capita income for the village was $33,227. About 0.9% of families and 3.5% of the population were below the poverty line, including 0.3% of those under age 18 and 5.0% of those age 65 or over.

Tourism

Historical markers
Haring Homestead, 606 S. Pascack Road

Landmarks and places of interest
Duryea Farm of the Fellowship Community - 101 Ackertown Road. The farm was founded in 1883. Beginning in 1960, the Duryeas invited the public to the harvest. The farm is now owned and operated by the Rudolf Steiner Fellowship Foundation, which converted the orchards and gardens to produce biodynamic organic fruits and vegetables. 
Little Red Schoolhouse Museum - 50 Schoolhouse Road, east of Route 45. Once a one-room schoolhouse, it is now a museum owned and operated by the east Ramapo Central School District. It was built in 1890 and used until the early 1970s when pre-kindergarten classes were held there.
Children's Park, located in east Chestnut Ridge. This park contains tennis courts, basketball courts, a play ground with swings, a junior sized baseball field as well as a paths through the woods and open fields for pets.

Education
Public schools
Chestnut Ridge Middle School
Eldorado Elementary School
Fleetwood Elementary School
Margetts Elementary School

Private schools
Green Meadow Waldorf School, a pre-kindergarten through 12th grade Waldorf school

Colleges and adult education centers
Sunbridge Institute, a Waldorf teacher training center
School of Eurythmy, a movement arts training in Eurythmy
The Pfeiffer Center, a biodynamic gardening and agricultural training center
The Threefold Educational Center, an educational trust

Noted employers
LeCroy Corporation, manufacturer of oscilloscopes and other testing gear

References

External links
 Village of Chestnut Ridge official website

Villages in New York (state)
Villages in Rockland County, New York